Igor Vladimirovich Klitsov (born 7 July 1986) is a former Russian professional football player.

Club career
He played two seasons in the Russian Football National League for FC Dynamo Bryansk.

See also
Football in Russia

References

External links
 
 
 Career summary by sportbox.ru

1986 births
Living people
Russian footballers
Association football defenders
FC Dynamo Stavropol players
FC Daugava players
FC Dynamo Bryansk players
Russian expatriate footballers
Expatriate footballers in Latvia